Jaco Peyper is a South African Rugby Union referee.

Peyper rose through the ranks in South Africa quickly, making his Super Rugby debut in 2008 while still in his 20s. In 2011 he was named as an official for the 2011 IRB Junior World Championship in Italy. This included the final between England and New Zealand where New Zealand won 33-22.

In 2012, Peyper was promoted to the International Rugby Board's elite panel and was tasked with refereeing Scotland's 2012 tour of Oceania. This included Scotland's 6-9 away win over Australia, 25-37 away win over Fiji and 16-17 away win over Samoa. He was also referee for Argentina v New Zealand clash in Round 5 of the 2012 Rugby Championship.

In 2015, Peyper was selected as one of the twelve referees for the 2015 Rugby World Cup.

In 2019, Peyper was selected as one of the twelve referees and only South African referee for the 2019 Rugby World Cup.

On 20 October 2019, Peyper was the referee for the 2019 Rugby World Cup quarter-final between Wales and France and sent off France's Sébastien Vahaamahina for an elbow. After the match a photograph emerged on social media showing him posing with Wales fans with his elbow on to the head of one of the fans and he was not considered for a World Cup semi-final the week after.

References

1980 births
Living people
South African rugby union referees
Super Rugby referees
SARU referees
Currie Cup referees
The Rugby Championship referees
Rugby World Cup referees
Six Nations Championship referees